He and She is an album by jazz trumpeter Wynton Marsalis that was released in 2009. The album reached a peak of number 6 on the Top Jazz Albums chart of Billboard magazine.

Music
A reviewer at commented Down Beat that "Using the vernacular of Langston Hughes, but writing in a formal, Olympian style inspired by Irish national poet William Butler Yeats, Marsalis alternates between words and music, reciting a stanza then dramatizing its theme with his quintet. At the end, he strings all the stanzas together, declaiming his long poem about the trials of love in a satisfying finale."

Track listing

Personnel
 Wynton Marsalis – trumpet
 Walter Blanding – tenor saxophone, soprano saxophone, clarinet
 Dan Nimmer – piano
 Carlos Henriquez – bass
 Ali Jackson – drums

References

2009 albums
EMI Records albums
Wynton Marsalis albums